Kopnino is a rural locality (a village) in Volosatovskoye Rural Settlement, Selivanovsky District, Vladimir Oblast, Russia. The population was 369 as of 2010. There are 3 streets.

Geography 
Kopnino is located on the Kestromka River, 12 km northwest of Krasnaya Gorbatka (the district's administrative centre) by road. Matveyevka is the nearest rural locality.

References 

Rural localities in Selivanovsky District